Mirko Herceg (born 26 February 1992) is a Bosnian handball player for Gyöngyösi KK and the Bosnian national team.

He represented Bosnia and Herzegovina at the 2020 European Men's Handball Championship.

References

External links

1992 births
Living people
Bosnia and Herzegovina male handball players
Sportspeople from Mostar
Expatriate handball players
Bosnia and Herzegovina expatriate sportspeople in Croatia
Bosnia and Herzegovina expatriate sportspeople in Hungary